JMHS may refer to:
 John Masefield High School, Ledbury, Herefordshire, United Kingdom
 Jackson Memorial High School, Jackson, New Jersey, United States
 James Madison High School (disambiguation)
 James Meehan High School, Macquarie Fields, New South Wales, Australia
 James Monroe High School (disambiguation)
 John Maland High School, Devon, Alberta, Canada
 John Marshall High School (disambiguation)
 John Muir High School (Pasadena, California), United States
 Jordan-Matthews High School, Siler City, North Carolina, United States